Elizabeth "Bessey" de Létourdie (born 15 July 1962) is a Seychellois sprinter. She competed in the women's 100 metres at the 1980 Summer Olympics held in Moscow, Russia.

References

External links
 

1962 births
Living people
Athletes (track and field) at the 1980 Summer Olympics
Seychellois female sprinters
Olympic athletes of Seychelles
Place of birth missing (living people)
Olympic female sprinters